The 2002 Women's Tri-Series was a Women's One Day International (WODI) cricket tournament that was held in England in July 2002. It was a tri-nation series between England, India and New Zealand. It was part of India's tour of England and Ireland, and followed New Zealand's tour of Ireland and the Netherlands.

New Zealand progressed to the final after winning the group with three wins from four matches, joined by England, who finished second. The final was won by New Zealand by 63 runs, therefore winning the tournament.

Squads

Points table

Source: ESPN Cricinfo

Fixtures

1st ODI

2nd ODI

3rd ODI

4th ODI

5th ODI

6th ODI

Final

See also
 Indian women's cricket team in England and Ireland in 2002
 New Zealand women's cricket team in Ireland and Netherlands in 2002

References

External links
 Women's Tri-Series 2002 from Cricinfo

Women's cricket tours of England
India women's national cricket team tours
New Zealand women's national cricket team tours
International cricket competitions in 2002
2002 in women's cricket